Below a list of all national champions in the women's high jump event in track and field from several countries.

Australia

1970: Carolyn Wright
1971: Carolyn Wright
1972: Raylene Parke
1973: Carolyn Lewis
1974: Raylene Parke
1975: Raylene Parke
1976: Christine Annison
1977: Christine Annison
1978: Katrina Gibbs
1979: Vanessa Browne
1980: Christine Stanton
1981: Christine Stanton
1982: Katrina Gibbs
1983: Christine Stanton
1984: Vanessa Browne
1985: Christine Stanton
1986: Christine Stanton
1987: Christine Stanton
1988: Vanessa Browne
1989: Vanessa Ward
1990: Vanessa Ward
1991: Alison Inverarity
1992: Tania Murray (NZL)
1993: Alison Inverarity
1994: Alison Inverarity
1995: Alison Inverarity
1996: Lea Haggett (GBR)
1997: Alison Inverarity
1998: Alison Inverarity
1999: Alison Inverarity
2000: Alison Inverarity
2001: Carmen Hunter
2002: Petrina Price
2003: Miyuki Aoyama (JPN)
2004: Petrina Price
2005: Sophia Begg
2006: Ellen Pettitt
2007: Ellen Pettitt
2008: Catherine Drummond
2009: Petrina Price

Belarus

1992: Tatyana Shevchik
1993: Galina Isachenko
1994: Tatyana Shevchik
1995: Tatyana Gulevich
1996: Tatyana Khramova
1997: Tatyana Khramova
1998: Tatyana Gulevich
1999: Tatyana Gulevich
2000: Tatyana Shevchik
2001: Tatyana Gulevich
2002: Tatyana Gulevich
2003: Olga Klimova
2004: Olga Chuprova
2005: Irina Chuyko
2006: Alesya Gerasimova

Belgium

1951: Jozefa Dierick
1952: Jozefa Dierick
1953: Jozefa Dierick
1954: Olga De Ceuster
1955: Jenny Van Gerdinge
1956: Marie-Louise Couwels
1957: Lieve Brijs
1958: Lea Van Hoogendorp
1959: Lea Van Hoogendorp
1960: Lieve Brijs
1961: Jeannine Knaepen
1962: Lieve Brijs
1963: Ghislaine De Pauw
1964: Anita Van de Aa
1965: Rita Van Herck
1966: Rita Van Herck
1967: Rita Van Herck
1968: Rita Van Herck
1969: Helga Deprez
1970: Rita Van Herck
1971: Roswitha Emonts-Gast
1972: Hilde Van Dijck
1973: Hilde Van Dijck
1974: Chris Van Landschoot
1975: Hilde Van Dijck
1976: Anne-Marie Pira
1977: Anne-Marie Pira
1978: Anne-Marie Pira
1979: Christine Soetewey
1980: Christine Soetewey
1981: Françoise Van Poelvoorde
1982: Christine Soetewey
1983: Christine Soetewey
1984: Christine Soetewey
1985: Christine Soetewey
1986: Christine Soetewey
1987: Christine Soetewey
1988: Natalja Jonckheere
1989: Sabine De Wachter
1990: May Verheyen
1991: Natalja Jonckheere
1992: Sabrina De Leeuw
1993: Sabrina De Leeuw
1994: Natalja Jonckheere
1995: Natalja Jonckheere
1996: Sabrina De Leeuw
1997: Sabrina De Leeuw
1998: Heidi Paesen
1999: Sabrina De Leeuw
2000: Tia Hellebaut
2001: Sabrina De Leeuw
2002: Tia Hellebaut
2003: Tia Hellebaut
2004: Sabrina De Leeuw
2005: Tia Hellebaut
2006: Sabrina De Leeuw
2007: Sabrina De Leeuw
2008: Sabrina De Leeuw
2009: Hanne Van Hessche
2010: Hannelore Desmet
2011: Hanne Van Hessche
2012: Hannelore Desmet
2013: Hanne Van Hessche
2014: Claire Orcel
2015: Claire Orcel
2016: Hanne Van Hessche

Bulgaria

1970: Katya Lazova
1971: Katya Lazova
1972: Yordanka Blagoeva
1973: Yordanka Blagoeva
1974: Stanka Valkanova
1975: Yordanka Blagoeva
1976: Stanka Valkanova
1977: Yordanka Blagoeva
1978: Tatyana Kamareva
1979: Yordanka Blagoeva
1980: Yordanka Blagoeva
1981: Lyudmila Andonova
1982: Lyudmila Andonova
1983: Silvia Koeva
1984: Lyudmila Andonova
1985: Stefka Kostadinova
1986: Stefka Kostadinova
1987: Stefka Kostadinova
1988: Stefka Kostadinova
1989: Rosanel Gogi
1990: Svetlana Leseva
1991: Stefka Kostadinova
1992: Lyudmila Andonova
1993: Eleonora Milusheva
1994: Eleonora Milusheva
1995: Venelina Veneva
1996: Stefka Kostadinova
1997: Khristina Kalcheva
1998: Khristina Kalcheva
1999: Eleonora Milusheva
2000: Eleonora Milusheva
2001: Eleonora Milusheva
2002: Eleonora Milusheva
2003: Maria Nikolova
2004: Venelina Veneva
2005: Elena Denkova
2006: Maria Nikolova
2007: Mirela Demireva
2008: Mirela Demireva
2009: Venelina Veneva-Mateeva
2010: Venelina Veneva-Mateeva
2011: Mirela Demireva
2012: Gergana Mincheva
2013: Mirela Demireva
2014: Mirela Demireva
2015: Galina Nikolova
2016: Elena Petrova
2017: Elena Petrova
2018: Venelina Veneva-Mateeva
2019: Eleonora Dragieva

Canada

1970: Debbie Brill
1971: Debbie Brill
1972: Louise Hanna
1973: Louise Hanna
1974: Debbie Brill
1975: Louise Walker
1976: Debbie Brill
1977: Maggie Woods
1978: Debbie Brill
1979: Brigitte Reid
1980: Debbie Brill
1981: Scarlet Vanden Bos
1982: Debbie Brill
1983: Debbie Brill
1984: Debbie Brill
1985: Jeannie Cockroft
1986: Shari Orders
1987: Leslie Estwick
1988: Linda Cameron
1989: Leslie Estwick
1990: Roberta Thoen
1991: Leslie Estwick
1992: Nathalie Belfort
1993: Wanita Dykstra
1994: Sara McGladdery
1995: Sara McGladdery
1996: Christina Livingston
1997: Christina Livingston
1998: Nicole Forrester
1999: Nicole Forrester
2000: Wanita May
2001: Wanita May
2002: Nicole Forrester
2003: Wanita May
2004: Wanita May
2005: Whitney Evans
2006: Nicole Forrester
2007: Nicole Forrester
2008: Nicole Forrester
2009: Jillian Drouin
2010: 
2011: Jillian Drouin
2012: Nicole Forrester
2013: Michelle Kinsella
2014: Alyxandria Treasure
2015: Alyxandria Treasure
2016: Alyxandria Treasure
2017: Alyxandria Treasure
2018: Alyxandria Treasure
2019: Emma Kimoto

China

1988: Jin Ling
1989: Wang Hui
1990: Zhang Tong
1991: Fu Xiuhong
1992: Wang Wei
1993: Ge Ping 
1994: Guan Weihua
1995: Liu Yen
1996: Wang Wei
1997: Wang Wei
1998: Jin Ling
1999: Jing Xuezhu
2000: Zhang Liwen
2001: Jing Xuezhu
2002: Lu Jieming
2003: Jing Xuezhu
2004: Jing Xuezhu
2005: Jing Xuezhu

Denmark

1980: Dorthe A. Rasmussen
1981: Dorthe A. Rasmussen
1982: Dorthe A. Rasmussen
1983: Lone Pleth Sørensen
1984: Lene Demsitz
1985: Lene Demsitz
1986: Birgitte Kristensen
1987: Dorthe Wolfsberg (Rasmussen)
1988: Dorthe Wolfsberg (Rasmussen)
1989: Lone Pleth Sørensen
1990: Lone Pleth Sørensen
1991: Charlotte Beiter
1992: Pia Zinck
1993: Pia Zinck
1994: Pia Zinck
1995: Pia Zinck
1996: Pia Zinck
1997: Pia Zinck
1998: Pia Zinck
1999: Karina Johansen
2000: Kathrine Nielsen
2001: Kathrine Nielsen
2002: Kathrine Nielsen
2003: Donata Jancewicz
2004: Donata Jancewicz
2005: Signe Vest
2006: Kathrine Nielsen
2007: Anne Møller

Estonia

1923: Rosine Peek
1924: Olga Rebane
1925: Lydia Tippo
1926: Antonia Kroon
1927: Ludmilla Einstein
1928: Magda Tomasson
1929: Gertrud Schiefner
1930: Lydia Raudsepp
1931: Lydia Raudsepp
1932: Olga Arras
1933: Olga Arras
1934: Lydia Raudsepp
1935: Lydia Erikson
1936: Olga Arras
1937: Olga Arras
1938: Olga Arras
1939: Leida Hiiepuu
1940: Olga Arras
1941: -
1942: Olga Usar
1943: Olga Usar
1944: Aino Unt
1945: Leida Hiiepuu
1946: Olga Usar
1947: Olga Usar
1948: Olga Usar
1949: Juta Raudsepp
1950: Aino Huimerind
1951: Juta Raudsepp
1952: Juta Raudsepp
1953: Taimi Kroon
1954: Maila Kurss
1955: Helvi Keller
1956: Helgi Haljasmaa
1957: Õie Munk
1958: Helgi Kivi
1959: Linda Kivi
1960: Valentina Pavlovitš
1961: Eha Sepp
1962: Valentina Pavlovitš
1963: Valentina Pavlovitš
1964: Valentina Pavlovitš
1965: Valentina Pavlovitš
1966: Ene Rampe
1967: Õie Munk
1968: Muza Vorotõntseva
1969: Ester Aavik
1970: Muza Lepik
1971: Reet Kaarneem
1972: Reet Kaarneem
1973: Malle Sang
1974: Malle Sang
1975: Reet Arrak
1976: Reet Arrak
1977: Marina Surovtseva
1978: Ljubov Stognei
1979: Reet Lindal
1980: Merle Kibus
1981: Lea Laks
1982: Siiri Schmidt
1983: Maiu Siraki
1984: Merle Kibus
1985: Maiu Siraki
1986: Ingrid Pulst
1987: Merike Suurkivi
1988: Virge Naeris
1989: Ly Niinelaid
1990: Ly Niinelaid
1991: Marika Raiski
1992: Virge Naeris
1993: Liina Põldots
1994: Virge Naeris
1995: Liina Põldots
1996: Liina Põldots
1997: Kärt Siilats
1998: Kärt Siilats
1999: Tiina Mägi
2000: Kärt Siilats
2001: Tiina Mägi
2002: Kärt Siilats
2003: Kärt Siilats
2004: Kärt Siilats
2005: Anna Iljuštšenko
2006: Anna Iljuštšenko
2007: Anna Iljuštšenko
2008: Anna Iljuštšenko
2009: Anna Iljuštšenko
2010: Anna Iljuštšenko
2011: Anna Iljuštšenko
2012: Eleriin Haas
2013: Anna Iljuštšenko
2014: Eleriin Haas
2015: Eleriin Haas
2016: Anna Iljuštšenko
2017: Grete Udras
2018: Eleriin Haas
2019: Grete Udras
2020: Lilian Turban
2021: Lilian Turban
2022: Karmen Bruus

Finland

1980: Minna Vehmasto
1981: Minna Vehmasto
1982: Lena Teckenberg
1983: Minna Vehmasto
1984: Niina Ranta
1985: Niina Vihanto (Ranta)
1986: Minna Rantanen
1987: Ringa Ropo
1988: Marita Pakarinen
1989: Sari Karjalainen
1990: Katja Kilpi
1991: Katja Kilpi
1992: Katja Kilpi
1993: Johanna Manninen
1994: Kaisa Lehtonen
1995: Kaisa Gustafsson
1996: Kaisa Gustafsson
1997: Kaisa Gustafsson
1998: Kaisa Gustafsson
1999: Marianne Mattas
2000: Hanna Mikkonen
2001: Hanna Mikkonen
2002: Hanna Mikkonen
2003: Hanna Mikkonen
2004: Alina Mattila
2005: Hanna Mikkonen
2006: Hanna Mikkonen
2007: Hanna Mikkonen
2008: Hanna Grobler (Mikkonen)
2009: Hanna Grobler (Mikkonen)
2010: Maiju Mattila
2011: Mari Sepänmaa
2012: Eleriin Haas (EST)
2013: Laura Rautanen
2014: Eleriin Haas (EST)

France

1980: Sylvie Prenveille
1981: Brigitte Rougeron
1982: Maryse Ewanjé-Epée
1983: Maryse Ewanjé-Epée
1984: Maryse Ewanjé-Epée
1985: Maryse Ewanjé-Epée
1986: Brigitte Rougeron
1987: Madely Beaugendre
1988: Maryse Ewanjé-Epée
1989: Madely Beaugendre
1990: Odile Lesage
1991: Jana Brenkusová (TCH)
1992: Sandrine Fricot
1993: Maryse Maury
1994: Sandrine Fricot
1995: Maryse Maury
1996: Maryse Maury
1997: Marie Collonvillé
1998: Sabrina De Leeuw (BEL)
1999: Irène Tiendrébéogo (BUR)
2000: Sabrina De Leeuw (BEL)
2001: Lucie Finez
2002: Gaëlle Niaré
2003: Gaëlle Niaré
2004: Gaëlle Niaré
2005: Melanie Skotnik
2006: Eunice Barber
2007: Melanie Skotnik
2008: Melanie Skotnik
2009: Melanie Melfort

Germany

East Germany

1971: Rita Schmidt
1972: Rita Schmidt
1973: Rosemarie Witschas
1974: Rosemarie Witschas
1975: Rita Kirst
1976: Rosemarie Ackermann
1977: Rosemarie Ackermann
1978: Jutta Kirst
1979: Rosemarie Ackermann
1980: Rosemarie Ackermann
1981: Andrea Reichstein
1982: Andrea Bienias
1983: Susanne Helm
1984: Andrea Bienias
1985: Susanne Helm
1986: Andrea Bienias
1987: Susanne Beyer
1988: Gabriele Günz
1989: Heike Balck
1990: Heike Balck

West Germany

1971: Renate Gärtner
1972: Ellen Mundinger
1973: Ulrike Meyfarth
1974: Karin Wagner
1975: Ulrike Meyfarth
1976: Brigitte Holzapfel
1977: Marlis Wilken
1978: Brigitte Holzapfel
1979: Ulrike Meyfarth
1980: Ulrike Meyfarth
1981: Ulrike Meyfarth
1982: Ulrike Meyfarth
1983: Ulrike Meyfarth
1984: Heike Redetzky
1985: Heike Redetzky
1986: Heike Redetzky
1987: Heike Redetzky
1988: Heike Redetzky
1989: Andrea Arens
1990: Heike Henkel

Unified Germany

1991: Heike Henkel
1992: Heike Henkel
1993: Heike Henkel
1994: Heike Balck
1995: Alina Astafei
1996: Alina Astafei
1997: Heike Balck
1998: Alina Astafei
1999: Heike Henkel
2000: Amewu Mensah
2001: Alina Astafei
2002: Elena Herzenberg
2003: Melanie Skotnik
2004: Ariane Friedrich
2005: Daniela Rath
2006: Julia Hartmann
2007: Ariane Friedrich
2008: Ariane Friedrich
2009: Ariane Friedrich
2010: Ariane Friedrich
2011: Melanie Bauschke
2012: Ariane Friedrich
2013: Marie-Laurence Jungfleisch
2014: Marie-Laurence Jungfleisch
2015: Marie-Laurence Jungfleisch

Great Britain

1970: Dorothy Shirley
1971: Debbie Brill (CAN)
1972: Ros Few
1973: Ilona Gusenbauer (AUT)
1974: Val Harrison
1975: Denise Brown
1976: Denise Brown
1977: Brenda Gibbs
1978: Carol Mathers
1979: Barbara Simmonds
1980: Ann-Marie Devally
1981: Ann-Marie Devally
1982: Barbara Simmonds
1983: Gillian Evans
1984: Diana Elliott
1985: Diana Davies(-Elliott)
1986: Diana Davies
1987: Hanne Haugland (NOR)
1988: Janet Boyle
1989: Diana Davies
1990: Lea Haggett
1991: Debbie Marti
1992: Lea Haggett
1993: Debbie Marti
1994: Julia Bennett
1995: Lea Haggett
1996: Debbie Marti
1997: Debbie Marti
1998: Jo Jennings
1999: Jo Jennings
2000: Jo Jennings
2001: Susan Jones
2002: Susan Jones
2003: Susan Jones
2004: Susan Jones
2005: Susan Jones
2006: Deirdre Ryan (IRL)
2007: Jessica Ennis
2008: Stephanie Pywell

Hungary

1980: Katalin Sterk
1981: Emese Béla
1982: Katalin Sterk
1983: Emese Béla
1984: Olga Juha
1985: Andrea Mátay
1986: Katalin Sterk
1987: Olga Juha
1988: Katalin Sterk
1989: Judit Kovács
1990: Judit Kovács
1991: Judit Kovács
1992: Judit Kovács
1993: Krisztina Solti
1994: Erzsébet Fazekas
1995: Erzsébet Fazekas
1996: Dóra Győrffy
1997: Dóra Győrffy
1998: Dóra Győrffy
1999: Dóra Győrffy
2000: Dóra Győrffy
2001: Dóra Győrffy
2002: Dóra Győrffy
2003: Dóra Győrffy
2004: Bernadett Bódi
2005: Dóra Győrffy
2006: Dóra Győrffy
2007: Dóra Győrffy
2008: Barbara Szabó
2009: Barbara Szabó
2010: Rita Babos
2011: Rita Babos
2012: Barbara Szabó
2013: Barbara Szabó
2014: Barbara Szabó
2015: Barbara Szabó
2016: Barbara Szabó
2017: Barbara Szabó

Italy

1923: L. Banzi
1924: Andreina Sacchi
1925: Andreina Sacchi
1926: L. Banzi
1927: Silia Martini
1928: Silia Martini
1929: Silia Martini
1930: Trebisonda Valla
1931: Trebisonda Valla
1932: Maria Cosselli
1933: Trebisonda Valla
1934: E. Lambertini
1935: M. Montarino
1936: Tina Migliasso
1937: Trebisonda Valla
1938: Modesta Puhar
1939: Elda Franco
1940: Trebisonda Valla
1941: Sara Aldovandri
1942: Gianna Jannoni
1943: C. Gallo
1944: not disputed
1945: not disputed
1946: Ester Palmesino
1947: Gianna Jannoni
1948: Ester Palmesino
1949: Gianna Jannoni
1950: Gianna Jannoni
1951: Gianna Jannoni
1952: Ester Palmesino
1953: Ester Palmesino
1954: Osvalda Giardi
1955: Paola Paternoster
1956: Osvalda Giardi
1957: Osvalda Giardi
1958: Osvalda Giardi
1959: Marinella Bortoluzzi
1960: Osvalda Giardi
1961: Marinella Bortoluzzi
1962: Osvalda Giardi
1963: Marinella Bortoluzzi
1964: Osvalda Giardi
1965: Gilda Cacciavillani
1966: Osvalda Giardi
1967: Anna Onofri
1968: Annalisa Lanci
1969: Rosa Bellamoli
1970: Sara Simeoni
1971: Sara Simeoni
1972: Sara Simeoni
1973: Sara Simeoni
1974: Sara Simeoni
1975: Sara Simeoni
1976: Sara Simeoni
1977: Sara Simeoni
1978: Sara Simeoni
1979: Sara Simeoni
1980: Sara Simeoni
1981: Sandra Dini
1982: Sara Simeoni
1983: Sara Simeoni
1984: Sandra Dini
1985: Sara Simeoni
1986: Alessandra Fossati
1987: Alessandra Bonfigliolo
1988: Barbara Fiammengo
1989: Roberta Bugarini
1990: Barbara Fiammengo
1991: Barbara Fiammengo
1992: Antonella Bevilacqua
1993: Antonella Bevilacqua
1994: Antonella Bevilacqua
1995: Francesca Sicari
1996: Antonella Bevilacqua
1997: Antonella Bevilacqua
1998: Francesca Bradamante
1999: Daniela Galeotti
2000: Antonietta Di Martino
2001: Antonietta Di Martino
2002: Anna Visigalli
2003: Antonella Bevilacqua
2004: Anna Visigalli
2005: Stefania Cadamuro
2006: Antonietta Di Martino
2007: Antonietta Di Martino
2008: Antonietta Di Martino
2009: Raffaella Lamera
2010: Antonietta Di Martino
2011: Raffaella Lamera
2012: Chiara Vitobello
2013: Alessia Trost
2014: Alessia Trost
2015: Desirée Rossit
2016: Alessia Trost
2017: Erika Furlani
2018: Elena Vallortigara
2019: Alessia Trost
2020: Elena Vallortigara
2021: Elena Vallortigara
2022: Elena Vallortigara

Japan

1980: Hisayo Fukumitsu
1981: Megumi Sato
1982: Hisayo Fukumitsu
1983: Megumi Sato
1984: Hisayo Fukumitsu
1985: Megumi Sato
1986: Masami Matsui
1987: Megumi Sato
1988: Megumi Sato
1989: Kim Hee-sun (KOR)
1990: Megumi Sato
1991: Megumi Sato
1992: Megumi Sato
1993: Megumi Sato
1994: Chinami Sadahiro
1995: Miki Imai
1996: Yoko Ota
1997: Yoko Ota
1998: Miki Imai
1999: Miki Imai
2000: Yoko Ota
2001: Miki Imai
2002: Yoko Ota
2003: Miki Imai
2004: Miki Imai
2005: Yoko Hunnicutt
2006: Miyuki Aoyama
2007: Miyuki Aoyama
2008: Miyuki Fukumoto
2009: Miyuki Fukumoto
2010: Kiyoka Fujisawa
2011: Miyuki Fukumoto
2012: Azumi Maeda
2013: Miyuki Fukumoto
2014: Yuki Watanabe
2015: Yuki Watanabe
2016: Moeko Kyoya
2017: Haruka Nakano
2018: Haruka Nakano
2019: Natsumi Kanda

Latvia

1991: Valentīna Gotovska
1992: Valentīna Gotovska
1993: Valentīna Gotovska
1994: Valentīna Gotovska
1995: Valentīna Gotovska
1996: Valentīna Gotovska
1997: Aiga Gulbe
1998: Aiga Gulbe
1999: Iveta Grunte
2000: Līga Kļaviņa
2001: Iveta Grunte
2002: Līga Kļaviņa
2003: Natālija Čakova
2004: Natālija Čakova
2005: Agnese Segliņa
2006: Natālija Čakova
2008: Natālija Čakova
2009: Natālija Čakova
2010: Laura Ikauniece

Lithuania

1990: Valentīna Gotovska (LAT)
1991: Nelė Savickytė
1992: Nelė Savickytė
1993: Nelė Žilinskienė
1994: Nelė Žilinskienė
1995: Dalia Leonavičiūtė
1996: Nelė Žilinskienė
1997: Remigija Nazarovienė
1998: Nelė Žilinskienė
1999: Nelė Žilinskienė
2000: Nelė Žilinskienė
2001: Nelė Žilinskienė
2002: Nelė Žilinskienė
2003: Viktorija Žemaitytė
2004: Viktorija Žemaitytė
2005: Austra Skujytė
2006: Viktorija Žemaitytė
2007: Karina Vnukova
2008: Karina Vnukova
2009: Karina Vnukova

Netherlands

1970: Miep van Beek
1971: Mieke van Doorn
1972: Ria Ahlers
1973: Ria Ahlers
1974: Annemieke Bouma
1975: Mieke van Doorn
1976: Ria Ahlers
1977: Mirjam van Laar
1978: Mirjam van Laar
1979: Sylvia Barlag
1980: Sylvia Barlag
1981: Sylvia Barlag
1982: Ella Wijnants
1983: Ella Wijnants
1984: Marjon Wijnsma
1985: Mariette Overwater
1986: Ella Wijnants
1987: Ella Wijnants
1988: Monique van der Weide
1989: Marjon Wijnsma
1990: Monique van der Weide
1991: Angelique Maasdijk
1992: Anoek van Diessen
1993: Bianca Gelauf
1994: Anoek van Diessen
1995: Karlijn van Beurden
1996: Monique van der Weide
1997: Marieke van der Heijden
1998: Marloes Lammerts
1999: Marloes Lammerts
2000: Denise Lewis (GBR)
2001: Marloes Lammerts
2002: Marloes Strooper-Lammerts
2003: Frenke Bolt
2004: Karin Ruckstuhl
2005: Yvonne Wisse
2006: Karin Ruckstuhl
2007: Karin Ruckstuhl
2008: Sietske Noorman
2009: Sietske Noorman
2010: Nadine Broersen
2011: Nadine Broersen
2012: Sietske Noorman
2013: Sietske Noorman
2014: Nadine Broersen
2015: Sietske Noorman
2016: Marlies van Haaren

New Zealand

1980: Claire Kavermann
1981: Angela Pule
1982: Claire Ryan
1983: Trudy Painter
1984: Trudy Painter
1985: Trudy Painter
1986: Trudy Painter
1987: Sue Barber
1988: Tania Murray
1989: Trudy Woodhead
1990: Tania Murray
1991: Tania Murray
1992: Tania Murray
1993: Tracy Phillips
1994: Tracy Phillips
1995: Kim Brown
1996: Tracy Phillips
1997: Tania Dixon
1998: Karen Brown
1999: Kim Brown
2000: Angela McKee
2001: Karen Brown
2002: Nadia Smith
2003: Angela McKee
2004: Angela McKee
2005: Angela McKee
2006: Angela McKee
2007: Sarah Cowley
2008: Sarah Saddleton
2009: Elizabeth Lamb
 2010: Sarah Cowley

Poland

1970: Danuta Konowska
1971: Danuta Prociów
1972: Danuta Konowska
1973: Anna Bubała
1974: Danuta Hołowińska
1975: Anna Pstuś
1976: Eugenia Więcek
1977: Danuta Bułkowska
1978: Urszula Kielan
1979: Elżbieta Krawczuk
1980: Urszula Kielan
1981: Elżbieta Krawczuk
1982: Danuta Bułkowska
1983: Danuta Bułkowska
1984: Danuta Bułkowska
1985: Danuta Bułkowska
1986: Danuta Bułkowska
1987: Danuta Bułkowska
1988: Danuta Bułkowska
1989: Danuta Bułkowska
1990: Beata Hołub
1991: Beata Hołub
1992: Beata Hołub
1993: Beata Hołub
1994: Urszula Kielan
1995: Donata Wawrzyniak
1996: Donata Jancewicz
1997: Agnieszka Giedrojć-Juraha
1998: Donata Jancewicz
1999: Donata Jancewicz
2000: Donata Jancewicz
2001: Anna Ksok
2002: Agnieszka Falasa
2003: Anna Ksok
2004: Anna Ksok
2005: Anna Ksok
2006: Karolina Gronau
2007: Kamila Stepaniuk
2008: Kamila Stepaniuk
2009: Kamila Stepaniuk
2010: Karolina Gronau
2011: Karolina Gronau/Magdalena Ogrodnik
2012: Izabela Mikołajczyk
2013: Justyna Kasprzycka
2014: Justyna Kasprzycka
2015: Kamila Lićwinko (Stepaniuk)
2016: Kamila Lićwinko (Stepaniuk)
2017: Kamila Lićwinko (Stepaniuk)
2018: Michalina Kwaśniewska
2019: Kamila Lićwinko (Stepaniuk)

Portugal

1970: Kathleen Binda
1971: Marília Carvalho
1972: Marília Carvalho
1973: Marília Carvalho
1974: Conceição Alves
1975: Conceição Alves
1976: Conceição Alves
1977: Cristina Abreu
1978: Cristina Abreu
1979: Cristina Abreu
1980: Cristina Abreu
1981: Cristina Abreu
1982: Cristina Abreu
1983: Graça Borges
1984: Graça Borges
1985: Graça Borges
1986: Graça Borges
1987: Manuela Barros
1988: Graça Borges
1989: Isabel Branco
1990: Maria José Travessa
1991: Isabel Branco
1992: Isabel Branco
1993: Isabel Branco
1994: Sandra Turpin
1995: Sónia Machado
1996: Sandra Turpin
1997: Sónia Machado
1998: Sónia Carvalho
1999: Sónia Carvalho
2000: Sónia Machado
2001: Sónia Carvalho
2002: Naide Gomes
2003: Liliana Viana
2004: Sónia Carvalho
2005: Sónia Carvalho
2006: Marisa Anselmo
2007: Marisa Anselmo
2008: Marisa Anselmo
2009: Marisa Anselmo
2010: Marisa Anselmo
2011: Liliana Viana
2012: Liliana Vieira
2013: Liliana Vieira
2014: Anabela Neto
2015: Anabela Neto
2016: Anabela Neto
2017: Anabela Neto
2018: Anabela Neto
2019: Anabela Neto
2020: Anabela Neto

Romania

1980: Cornelia Popa
1981: Niculina Vasile
1982: Niculina Vasile
1983: Gabriela Margineanu
1984: Niculina Vasile
1985: Gabriela Mihalcea
1986: Alina Astafei
1987: Elena Schromm
1988: Alina Astafei
1989: Alina Astafei
1990: Olimpia Constantea
1991: Olimpia Constantea
1992: Alina Astafei
1993: Oana Musunoi
1994: Adriana Solcanu
1995: Monica Iagăr
1996: Monica Iagăr
1997: Monica Iagăr
1998: Monica Iagăr
1999: Oana Pantelimon
2000: Monica Iagăr
2001: Oana Pantelimon
2002: Ramona Pop
2003: Oana Pantelimon
2004: Monica Iagăr
2005: Monica Iagăr
2006: Andreea Ispan

Russia

1992: Yelena Gribanova
1993: Yelena Topchina
1994: Yelena Topchina
1995: Viktoriya Fyodorova
1996: Tatyana Motkova
1997: Olga Kaliturina
1998: Viktoriya Fyodorova
1999: Yelena Yelesina
2000: Marina Kuptsova
2001: Yekaterina Aleksandrova
2002: Marina Kuptsova
2003: Marina Kuptsova
2004: Anna Chicherova
2005: Yelena Slesarenko
2006: Yekaterina Savchenko
2007: Anna Chicherova
2008: Anna Chicherova
2009: Anna Chicherova
2010: Svetlana Shkolina
2011: Anna Chicherova
2012: Anna Chicherova

Spain

1931: Aurora Villa
1932: Aurora Villa
1933: María Morros
1935: Josefa Wunderlich
1963: Mercedes Morales
1964: María Teresa Carrascosa
1965: Mercedes Morales
1966: Teresa María Roca
1967: Teresa María Roca
1968: Sagrario Aguado
1969: Teresa María Roca
1970: Sagrario Aguado
1971: Teresa María Roca
1972: Sagrario Aguado
1973: Sagrario Aguado
1974: Sagrario Aguado
1975: Sagrario Aguado
1976: Isabel Mozún
1977: Isabel Mozún
1978: Isabel Mozún
1979: Isabel Mozún
1980: Isabel Mozún
1981: Isabel Mozún
1982: Isabel Mozún
1983: Isabel Mozún
1984: Isabel Mozún
1985: Covadonga Mateos
1986: Covadonga Mateos
1987: Asunción Morte
1988: Mónica Calvo
1989: Isabel Mozún
1990: María Mar Martínez
1991: Belén Sáenz
1992: Belén Sáenz
1993: Belén Sáenz
1994: María Mar Martínez
1995: Marta Mendía
1996: Carlota Castrejana
1997: Marta Mendía
1998: María Mar Martínez

1999: Marta Mendía
2000: Marta Mendía
2001: Marta Mendía
2002: Marta Mendía
2003: Ruth Beitia
2004: Marta Mendía
2005: Marta Mendía
2006: Ruth Beitia
2007: Ruth Beitia
2008: Ruth Beitia
2009: Ruth Beitia
2010: Ruth Beitia
2011: Ruth Beitia
2012: Ruth Beitia
2013: Ruth Beitia
2014: Ruth Beitia
2015: Ruth Beitia
2016: Ruth Beitia
2017: Ruth Beitia

Sweden

1980: Ann-Ewa Karlsson
1981: Susanne Lorentzon
1982: Susanne Lorentzon
1983: Susanne Lorentzon
1984: Susanne Lorentzon
1985: Susanne Lorentzon
1986: Susanne Lorentzon
1987: Monica Westén
1988: Monica Westén
1989: Christina Nordström
1990: Monica Westén
1991: Ann Högberg
1992: Maria Gruffman
1993: Ingela Sandqvist
1994: Emelie Färdigh
1995: Emelie Färdigh
1996: Emelie Färdigh
1997: Kajsa Bergqvist
1998: Kajsa Bergqvist
1999: Kajsa Bergqvist
2000: Kajsa Bergqvist
2001: Kajsa Bergqvist
2002: Kajsa Bergqvist
2003: Kajsa Bergqvist
2004: Carolina Klüft
2005: Emma Green
2006: Kajsa Bergqvist
2007: Emma Green
2008: Emma Green
2009: Emma Green
2010: Emma Green
2011: Emma Green Tregaro

Ukraine 

1992: Inha Babakova
1993: Larisa Serebryanska
1994: Iryna Mykhalchenko
1995: Vita Styopina
1996: Vita Styopina
1997: Iryna Mykhalchenko
1998: Iryna Mykhalchenko
1999: Vita Styopina
2000: Iryna Mykhalchenko
2001: Vita Palamar
2002: Iryna Mykhalchenko
2003: Vita Palamar
2004: Vita Styopina
2005: Iryna Mykhalchenko
2006: Iryna Mykhalchenko
2007: Vita Palamar
2008: Vita Styopina
2009: Vita Styopina
2010: Vita Styopina
2011: Oksana Okunyeva
2012: Olena Kholosha
2013: Oksana Okunyeva
2014: Oksana Okunyeva
2015: Oksana Okunyeva
2016: Oksana Okunyeva
2017: Oksana Okunyeva
2018: Yuliya Levchenko
2019: Yuliya Levchenko
2020: Oksana Okunyeva

United States

1959: Lis Josefsen (DEN)
1960: Lis Josefsen (DEN)
1961: Lis Josefsen (DEN)
1962: Kinuko Sutsumi (JAP)
1963: Eleanor Montgomery
1964: Eleanor Montgomery
1965: Eleanor Montgomery
1966: Eleanor Montgomery
1967: Eleanor Montgomery
1968: Theresa Thresher
1969: Eleanor Montgomery
1970: Sally Plihal
1971: Linda Iddings
1972: Audrey Reid (JAM)
1973: Deanne Wilson
1974: Joni Huntley
1975: Joni Huntley
1976: Joni Huntley
1977: Joni Huntley
1978: Louise Ritter
1979: Debbie Brill (CAN)
1980: Coleen Rienstra
1981: Pam Spencer
1982: Debbie Brill (CAN)
1983: Louise Ritter
1984: Pam Spencer
1985: Louise Ritter
1986: Louise Ritter
1987: Coleen Sommer
1988: Jan Wohlschlag
1989: Jan Wohlschlag
1990: Yolanda Henry
1991: Yolanda Henry
1992: Tanya Hughes
1993: Tanya Hughes
1994: Angela Bradburn
1995: Amy Acuff
1996: Tisha Waller
1997: Amy Acuff
1998: Tisha Waller
1999: Tisha Waller

2000: Karol Damon
2001: Amy Acuff
2002: Tisha Waller
2003: Amy Acuff
2004: Tisha Waller
2005: Amy Acuff
2006: Chaunté Howard
2007: Amy Acuff
2008: Chaunté Howard
2009: Chaunté Howard
2010: Chaunté Lowe
2011: Brigetta Barrett
2012: Chaunté Lowe
2013: Brigetta Barrett
2014: Chaunté Lowe
2015: Chaunté Lowe

Yugoslavia

1980: Lidija Benedetić
1981: Stanka Prezelj
1982: Lidija Lapajne
1983: Biljana Bojović
1984: Tamara Malešev
1985: Darja Lichteneger
1986: Biljana Petrović
1987: Biljana Petrović
1988: Amra Temim
1989: Biljana Petrović
1990: Biljana Petrović
1991: Gabrijela Markuš
1992: Szilvia Barta
1993: Jasna Antonijević
1994: Tatjana Mitrovic
1995: Jasna Antonijević
1996: Jasna Antonijević
1997: Marijana Buljovcic
1998: Marijana Buljovcic
1999: Jelena Šcekic
2000: Jelena Šcekic
2001: Marija Plazinic
2002: Mirjana Lisica

References

 GBRathletics
 New Zealand Champions
 RusAthletics

Women
National champions (women)
Lists of female athletes